The Journal of Earthquake and Tsunami was founded in 2007 and is published by World Scientific. The journal published articles and papers relating to earthquakes and tsunamis, in particular: geological and seismological setting, ground motion, site and building response, tsunami generation, propagation, damage and mitigation, as well as education and risk management.

External links 
 

Publications established in 2007
Engineering journals
Geology journals
Quarterly journals
English-language journals
World Scientific academic journals